Johnston Township is an inactive township in Macon County, in the U.S. state of Missouri.

Johnston Township was established in 1872, and named after Richard Johnston, a pioneer citizen.

References

Townships in Missouri
Townships in Macon County, Missouri